Dumsi is a village in the Lekang (Mahadevpur) sub-district of Lohit district in Arunachal Pradesh, India. According to the 2011 Census of India it had 525 residents in 103 households. 262 were male and 263 were female.

References 

Villages in Lohit district